Angoda may refer to:

 Angoda, Ivory Coast, a town in the Lacs District, Ivory Coast
 Angoda, Western Province, Sri Lanka, a village in Western Province, Sri Lanka